Sophisticated Lady is a live album by Ella Fitzgerald, accompanied by Joe Pass, released in 2001 (see 2001 in music).

Track listing
For the 2001 Pablo CD Issue, PACD-5310-2
 Ella's Introduction of Joe — 0:25
 "I'm Beginning to See the Light" (Duke Ellington, Don George, Johnny Hodges, Harry James) – 3:12
 Medley: "I Got It Bad (and That Ain't Good)"/"Sophisticated Lady" (Ellington, Paul Francis Webster)/(Ellingon, Irving Mills, Mitchell Parish) – 6:48
 "One Note Samba" (Antonio Carlos Jobim, Newton Mendonça) – 7:08
 "Georgia on My Mind" (Hoagy Carmichael, Stuart Gorrell) – 4:47
 "Gone with the Wind" (Herbert Magidson, Allie Wrubel) – 3:14
 "Bluesette" (Norman Gimbel, Toots Thielemans) – 3:49
 "Old Folks" (Dedette Lee Hill, Willard Robison) – 5:04
 "Wave" (Jobim) – 5:19
 "Cherokee" (Ray Noble) – 5:34
 "Take Love Easy" (Ellington, John La Touche) – 6:14
 "Mood Indigo" (Ellington, Barney Bigard, Mills) – 2:29
 "Satin Doll" (Ellington, Johnny Mercer) – 3:26

Personnel
Recorded in Hamburg, Germany and Tokyo, Japan in 1975 and 1983.

 Ella Fitzgerald - vocals
 Joe Pass - guitar
 David Prince - liner notes
 Kirk Felton - remastering

References

Vocal–instrumental duet albums
Albums produced by Norman Granz
Ella Fitzgerald live albums
2001 live albums
Pablo Records live albums
Joe Pass live albums